Francisco Serrano Plowells (born May 4, 1980 in Monterrey) is a triathlete from Mexico. He competed at the 2008 Summer Olympics in Beijing, where he placed forty-fourth in the men's triathlon, with a time of 1:54:46, and at the 2011 Pan American Games in Guadalajara, where he finished eighteenth in the same event, with his personal best of 1:53:04.

At the peak of his career, Serrano has won six Pan American Cup titles in over fifty competitions, including five in his home turf.

References

External links
ITU Profile

1980 births
Mexican male triathletes
Living people
Olympic triathletes of Mexico
Triathletes at the 2008 Summer Olympics
Sportspeople from Monterrey
Triathletes at the 2011 Pan American Games
Pan American Games competitors for Mexico